Chrysops calopterus is a species of deer fly in the family Tabanidae.

Distribution
Guatemala.

References

Tabanidae
Insects described in 1905
Diptera of North America
Endemic fauna of Guatemala